Hervé Boussard  (8 March 1966 – 26 June 2013) was a French cyclist. He won a bronze medal in team time trial in the 1992 Summer Olympics. He died in 2013 from an epileptic seizure.

See also
 List of people with epilepsy

References

1966 births
2013 deaths
French male cyclists
Olympic bronze medalists for France
Cyclists at the 1992 Summer Olympics
Olympic cyclists of France
Olympic medalists in cycling
People from Pithiviers
Medalists at the 1992 Summer Olympics
Neurological disease deaths in France
Deaths from epilepsy
Sportspeople from Loiret
Cyclists from Centre-Val de Loire